Jimmy Justice is the name of:

 Jimmy Justice (musician) (1939–2022), English pop singer
 Jimmy Justice (activist), pseudonym of a video activist in New York City